Longchuan West railway station is a railway station in Longchuan County, Heyuan, Guangdong, China. It opened with the Ganzhou–Shenzhen high-speed railway on 10 December 2021. It will also be on the Meizhou–Longchuan high-speed railway in the future.

See also
Longchuan railway station

References 

Railway stations in Guangdong
Railway stations in China opened in 2021